AV8 Air was an airline based in the United Kingdom. It was established in June 2003 and started operations on 25 November 2003.

History
It was launched as a subsidiary of tour operator CT2 and began operations on 7 April 2004 with a long-haul flight to Cape Town using a Boeing 767-300ER aircraft. The company operated the 767 on a damp lease basis from Icelandair until their own Air Operator's Certificate (AOC) was granted from the UK Civil Aviation Authority (CAA). Unfortunately, due to a lack of a bond, the AOC was revoked. A Boeing 757-200 aircraft was intended for use on short-haul flights to Mediterranean resorts, but due to the unsuccessful AOC application, the aircraft was only operated on a weekly check flight around Manchester. The airline ceased trading after only five months.

Code data 
ICAO Code: MNF
Callsign: RINGWAY

AV8 Air originally intended to use "PENNINE" as their ICAO callsign, but due to clashes with 'Peninne Radar' in the Manchester TMA, this was rejected.

See also
 List of defunct airlines of the United Kingdom

External links
AV8 Air Former  Fleet Detail

Defunct airlines of the United Kingdom
Airlines established in 2003
Airlines disestablished in 2004